Grace Gabriel Ofodile (born 25 June 1988) is a Nigerian badminton player. She won the women's singles title at the 2012 and 2013 African Championships. Gabriel also won the women's singles silver medal at the 2011 and 2015 African Games.

Career 
She won the silver medal in the women's singles at the 2011 All-Africa Games.
She became the runner-up in the women's singles event at the 2014 African Badminton Championships.
She won second place at the 2015 All Africa Games.

In September 2013, it was reported that she was one of the 14 players selected for the Road to Rio Program, a program that aimed to help African badminton players to compete at the 2016 Olympic Games.

She studied at Fontys University of Applied Sciences and lives in the Netherlands.

Achievements

All-Africa Games 
Women's singles

Women's doubles

African Championships 
Women's singles

Women's doubles

Mixed doubles

BWF International Challenge/Series (8 titles, 11 runners-up) 
Women's singles

Women's doubles

  BWF International Challenge tournament
  BWF International Series tournament
  BWF Future Series tournament

References

External links 
 
 

1988 births
Living people
Sportspeople from Jos
Nigerian female badminton players
Competitors at the 2007 All-Africa Games
Competitors at the 2011 All-Africa Games
Competitors at the 2015 African Games
African Games gold medalists for Nigeria
African Games silver medalists for Nigeria
African Games bronze medalists for Nigeria
African Games medalists in badminton
21st-century Nigerian women